Thomas David "Tim" Foley (born January 22, 1948) is a former American football player.

Foley starred at Loyola Academy in Wilmette, Illinois before moving on to Purdue University, where he received All-American honors as a defensive back in 1969.  He then played 11 seasons (1970–1980), all of which were with the Miami Dolphins of the National Football League.  He was named to the Pro Bowl in 1979.

He was an analyst for TBS College Football as well as Miami Dolphins preseason.

Assistant football coach Miami lake’s Optimist 115lb team

Post career he worked as a college football analyst. He also was a diamond in the Amway organization, and involved in many controversial lawsuits.

References

Purdue Boilermakers football players
Miami Dolphins players
American Conference Pro Bowl players
Sportspeople from Evanston, Illinois
1948 births
Living people
American football safeties
American football cornerbacks
College football announcers
National Football League announcers
Miami Dolphins announcers